Cavallo may refer to:

People
 Daniela Cavallo (born 1975), German business executive
 Diana Cavallo (1931–2017), American writer
 Domingo Cavallo (born 1946), Argentine economist and politician
 Émile-Gustave Cavallo-Péduzzi (1851–1917), French painter
 Jimmy Cavallo (1927–2019), American musician
 Josh Cavallo (born 1999), Australian association football player
 Mimmo Cavallo (born 1951), Italian musician
 Ricardo Cavallo (born 1951), Argentine political activist
 Rob Cavallo (born 1963), American music producer 
 Tiberius Cavallo (1749–1809), Anglo-Italian physicist
 Victor Cavallo (1947–2000), Italian actor

Other
 Cavallo (coin), an Italian Renaissance coin 
 Cavallo (island), an island near Corsica
 Cavallo, Ohio, a community in the United States
 Cavallo di ritorno
 Monte Cavallo

See also
 Cavalli
 Leoncavallo